Our Crazy Aunts is a 1961 Austrian comedy film directed by Rolf Olsen and starring Gunther Philipp, Gus Backus, and Vivi Bach. It was followed by two sequels Our Crazy Nieces and Our Crazy Aunts in the South Seas.

The film's sets were designed by the art director Felix Smetana.

Cast

References

Bibliography

External links 
 

1961 films
1961 musical comedy films
Austrian musical comedy films
1960s German-language films
Films directed by Rolf Olsen
Cross-dressing in film